The Women's Freestyle 62 kg is a competition featured at the 2019 European Wrestling Championships, and was held in Bucharest, Romania on April 11 and April 12.

Medalists

Results 
 Legend
 F — Won by fall

Final

Top half

Bottom half

Repechage

References

Women's Freestyle 62 kg
2019 in women's sport wrestling